El Pao is a town in Cojedes and seat of the Pao de San Juan Bautista Municipality. Its economy is mostly agricultural.

The town was founded in 1661 by a Franciscan mission.

Geography 
El Palo is located at an elevation of 132m above sea level.

Points of interest 
The town  has one of the oldest churches in Venezuela, the church of San Juan Bautista, first built in 1661. It also has a colonial church built in 1782.

The town is located adjacent to the Pao dam.

See also 
 List of towns in Venezuela named El Pao

References 

Populated places in Cojedes (state)
Populated places established in 1661
1661 establishments in the Spanish Empire